Joseph John Aquilina (born 16 February 1957 in Malta) was a professional footballer and manager. During his career, he played as a midfielder for Sliema Wanderers.

Aquilina has coached Marsaxlokk and Valletta. On 20 October 2010 Aquilina was appointed coach of the Zurrieq F.C. 
 
Recently JJ was appointed as assistant coach at Floriana in order to assist senior team coach Nicolas Hernan Chiesa with his managerial duties.

References

1957 births
Living people
Maltese footballers
Malta international footballers
Sliema Wanderers F.C. players
Maltese football managers
Marsaxlokk F.C. managers
Association football midfielders